Zvonimir Mršić (born 9 January 1966) is a Croatian manager, former CEO of food company Podravka and a former member of the Croatian Parliament.

Mršić was born in Koprivnica. He graduated from the Faculty of Political Science of the University of Zagreb in 1990. He is a member of the Social Democratic Party of Croatia. From 1997 to 1999 Mršić was deputy mayor and from 2001 to 2012 mayor of Koprivnica. He was a member of parliament from 22 December 2003 to 24 February 2012. Between 2012 and 2017, Mršić served as the CEO of Podravka.

Publications

References

1966 births
Living people
Representatives in the modern Croatian Parliament
Social Democratic Party of Croatia politicians
Croatian businesspeople
People from Koprivnica